Orbiter is a 1986 video game published by Spectrum HoloByte.

Gameplay
Orbiter is a game in which the astronauts are launched into space, can deploy, retrieve, and repair satellites, and take spacewalks in the Manned Maneuvering Unit in a space shuttle simulation.

Reception
Frank Boosman reviewed the game for Computer Gaming World, and stated that "Orbiter is not a grip-the-sides-of-your-seat, sweat-running-down-your-forehead game. But if you really want to know how the Space Shuttle works or relive some of your childhood fantasies, then Orbiter is just the ticket."

Reviews
Tilt - Mar, 1987
ASM (Aktueller Software Markt) - Apr, 1989
The Games Machine - May, 1989

References

External links
Review in PC Magazine
Review in Page 6
Review in Macworld
Article in MacUser
Article in PC Games
Review in Washington Apple Pi
Review in Atari Explorer
Review in Videogame & Computer World

1986 video games
Atari ST games
Classic Mac OS games
DOS games
Realistic space simulators
Space flight simulator games
Spectrum HoloByte games
Video games developed in the United States